The 6th Battle Squadron was a squadron of the British Royal Navy consisting of Battleships serving in the Grand Fleet and existed from 1913 to 1917.

History

First World War

August 1914

In August 1914, the 6th Battle Squadron was based at Portland and comprised a number of the older pre-dreadnought battleships it was then assigned to the Second Fleet these included:

 and  transferred to the 5th Battle Squadron in late 1914.  briefly joined the squadron in 1915, before the squadron was broken up. Most of the ships were sent to the Mediterranean.

Reformation

After preparations for "distant service", and  sailed for the British Isles on 25 November and reached Scapa Flow, Orkney Islands, on 7 December 1917. Although retaining their American designation as Battleship Division 9, those four dreadnoughts became the Sixth Battle Squadron of the British Grand Fleet upon arrival in British waters. The 6th Battle Squadron operated from Scapa Flow and Rosyth.

The U.S. Battleships serving in the 6th Battle Squadron were:

 - arrived January 1918
 - replaced USS Delaware July 1918

Vice and Rear-Admirals commanding
Post holders as follows:

Note:  RADMHFSNORE Rear-Admiral, Home Fleets at the Nore.

References

Sources
Dittmar, F.J & Colledge J.J., British Warships 1914-1919 Ian Allan, London. 1972; 
McMahon, William E., Dreadnought Battleships and Battle Cruisers'' University Press of America, 1978;

External links
 Sixth Battle Squadron at DreadnoughtProject.org

Battle squadrons of the Royal Navy
Ship squadrons of the Royal Navy in World War I
Military units and formations established in 1913
Military units and formations disestablished in 1917